Villeurbanne is a commune in the Metropolis of Lyon in Auvergne-Rhône-Alpes region in eastern France.

It is situated northeast of Lyon, with which it forms the heart of the second-largest metropolitan area in France after that of Paris. Villeurbanne is the second-largest commune in the metropolitan area of Lyon and the 20th most populated in France. In 2013, Villeurbanne was elected the city with the best administration of France, which attracts more and more people.

History

The current location of downtown Villeurbanne is known to have been inhabited as far back as 6000 BC. Its current name comes from a Gallo-Roman farming area, established at about the same time as Lyon (then Lugdunum) and known as the Villa Urbana ("town house"). It would then become Urbanum, then Villa Urbane and, ultimately, Villeurbanne.

Villeurbanne has belonged to the kingdom of France since 1349. It was then separated from La Guillotière (A former city lately incorporated into Lyon as the 3rd, 6th, 7th and 8th Arrondissement) by the river La Rize, a former branch of the Rhône River.

Until the 19th century, the city was merely a patchwork of distinct villages separated by fields and undeveloped land. These villages have mostly survived, and nowadays form the neighborhoods of Charpennes, Cusset, Croix-Luizet, Maisons-Neuves, etc.

With the industrial era, Villeurbanne's economy soared: the textile industry was the first to bloom, followed by mechanical and chemical ones. The factories lured in numerous immigrants, most notably from Italy.

20th century
Transforming from a rural community to an industrial town, Villeurbanne underwent a tremendous demographic boom in the late 1920s. From 3,000 inhabitants in 1928, its population rocketed to 82,000 in 1931. Mayor Lazare Goujon (elected 1924) engaged the city in a vast public works initiative. Arguably the most visible heritage of this program is the Gratte-Ciel, a housing complex made up of two Art Deco towers and annex smaller buildings, lining up along the Avenue Henri Barbusse. These structures built between 1924 and 1934 are the work of architect Môrice Leroux, with a contribution of Tony Garnier. They are one of the most notable Art Deco structures in France and the 19-story twin towers have become an emblem of the city.

Villeurbanne city hall was built by Robert Giroud, a disciple of Tony Garnier (architect) and friend of Môrice Leroux.

Education

Primary and secondary schools

Public senior high schools:
Lycée Faÿs
Lycée Alfred de Musset
Lycée Marie Curie Villeurbanne
Lycée Pierre Brossolette
Lycée Magenta

Private schools:
Institution Scolaire Immaculée Conception is a private school from elementary to high school/sixth-form with three campuses, two elementary and one secondary.
École Beth Menahem (a Jewish school from preschool to senior high/sixth-form)

Colleges and universities
Many colleges and universities of the Lyon metropolitan area are located in Villeurbanne. Many of these are located on the La Doua campus, home to the Claude Bernard University (Lyon I), a public university, CPE Lyon and the Institut National des Sciences Appliquées de Lyon, one of the premier engineering institute (Grandes écoles) in France, very well known for high quality education and for research in France.

Weekend schools
The Association Pour le Developpement de la Langue et de la Culture Japonaises (ADLCJ; リヨン補習授業校 Riyon Hoshū Jugyō Kō), a part-time Japanese supplementary school, is held in the Maison Berty Albrecht in Villeurbanne. It was formed in 1987.

Transport
Villeurbanne is well served by the Lyon area public transit system, the TCL (Transports en Commun Lyonnais). The east branch of subway line A runs through the city heart, and the new tramway lines T1 and T4 connects the La Doua campus to the Lyon business and commercial district of La Part-Dieu and the Presqu'île downtown.

Twin towns – sister cities

Villeurbanne is twinned with:
 Abanilla, Spain
 Abovyan, Armenia
 Bat Yam, Israel
 Mogilev, Belarus

In addition, Villeurbanne has a friendship declaration with:
 Stepanakert, Republic of Artsakh

Demography

In terms of population, Villeurbanne is the second largest city in the Metropolis of Lyon, the fourth largest in the Auvergne-Rhône-Alpes region, and the 21st largest in France.

Notable people
Henry Bertrand, silk weaver
Henri Cochet (1901–1987), tennis player
Charles Hernu (1923–1990), politician, mayor of Villeurbanne (1977–1990)
Mourad Benhamida (born 1986), footballer
Laure Manaudou (born 1986), swimmer, world record holder
Jean-Karl Vernay (born 1987), race car driver
Florent Manaudou (born 1990), swimmer
Gnonsiane Niombla (born 1990), handball player
Xavier Chavalerin (born 1991), footballer
Amos Youga (born 1992), footballer
Willem Geubbels (born 2001), footballer

See also
 Communes of the Metropolis of Lyon

References

External links

  
 Villeurbanne Message Board 

 
Communes of Lyon Metropolis
Dauphiné
Cities in France